Hellerella is a genus of flies belonging to the family Sphaeroceridae, the lesser dung flies.

Species
H. decipiens (Duda, 1920)

References

Sphaeroceridae
Diptera of South America
Taxa named by Oswald Duda
Brachycera genera